Watt Marcus (born 26 November 1973), is a Malaysian rock musician best known as the bass guitarist of the Bornean hard rock band Masterpiece. Marcus joined Masterpiece in 2003 as the band's bassist, with whom he achieved mainstream success in the late 2000s.

Personal life
Watt Marcus was born on 26 November 1973 and raised in the town of Sibu, Sarawak.

Career

Masterpiece (2003–present)

Marcus is a former bass player for a semi-regular touring rock band named Black Monkey from Sibu, Sarawak, along with the band's current lead vocalist, Depha. In 2003, while he is still playing for Black Monkey, he was approached by a founding member of Masterpiece, Willy Edwin and his brother Kennedy Edwin to join the band as a session bass player. He has since become a permanent member of the band and responsible for the bassline on all released albums by the band.

Discography
Masterpiece

 Merindang Ke Bintang (2009)
 Rock & Roll (2013)
 Ngap Sayot (2014)
 Ngarap Ka Nuan Nikal Pulai (2016)
 Ensera Paragon (2018)

Compilations & single
 "Mansau Leka Padi" (2011)
 "Berami Ba Ati Nuan" (2014)
 "Nadai Ati Berami" (2015)

References

1973 births
Living people
People from Sarawak
Malaysian rock musicians
Masterpiece (band) members
Rock bass guitarists
Iban people
21st-century bass guitarists